The Pircancha Formation is a Floian to Dapingian geologic formation of southern Bolivia. The green mudstones, shales and sandstones were deposited in a shallow to open marine environment. The fossil Pircanchaspis rinconensis is named after the formation.

Fossil content 
The formation has provided the following fossils:

 Bactroceras boliviensis
 Baltograptus deflexus, B. minutus
 Pircanchaspis rinconensis
 Pseudophyllograptus densus
 Tetragraptus cf. amii
 Didymograptus cf. suecicus
 Basilicus sp.
 Dinorthis sp.
 Famatinolithus sp.
 Geragnostus sp.
 Hoekaspis sp.
 Phyllograptus sp.
 Synhomalonotus sp.

See also 
 List of fossiliferous stratigraphic units in Bolivia

References

Bibliography

Further reading 
 B.-D. Erdtmann, B. Weber, H.-P. Schultze and S. Egenhoff. 2000. A possible agnathan plate from the lower Arenig (Lower Ordovician) of South Bolivia. Journal of Vertebrate Paleontology 20(2):394-399
 M. Toro and S. Fernandez. 1979. Los fósiles de la formación Pircancha aflorante en Chilcayo, Provincia Méndez - Depto. Tarija. Revista de la Academia Nacional de Ciencas de Bolivia 163-169

Geologic formations of Bolivia
Ordovician System of South America
Ordovician Bolivia
Dapingian
Floian
Mudstone formations
Shale formations
Sandstone formations
Open marine deposits
Shallow marine deposits
Ordovician southern paleotemperate deposits
Paleontology in Bolivia
Formations